Larslan is an unincorporated community in Valley County, Montana, United States. The community has a post office with ZIP code 59244. Next to the post office there is an old one-room school house, play structure and basketball court.

The Larslan post office opened in 1918. Beginning in the late 1920s, the town had a sizeable Mennonite population; the Mennonite Brethren Church held services from 1928 to 1990.

References

Unincorporated communities in Valley County, Montana
Unincorporated communities in Montana
Mennonitism in Montana